Gilbert Saboya Sunyé (born 28 July 1966) is an Andorran economist and politician. He is currently the minister of Foreign Affairs to the Principality of Andorra, since his appointment in 2011. Previously, he was the president of the Committee of Ministers of the Council of Europe from November 9, 2012 until May 16, 2013. From March 23, 2015 until April 1, 2015 he was acting prime minister of Andorra.

Early life and education
Gilbert Saboya Sunyé was born 28 July 1966 in Sant Julià de Lòria, Andorra. He graduated from Toulouse 1 University Capitole.

Political career
Before 2001, he was a member of the National Democratic Group. He was a member of the Democratic Party from 2001 until 2005. He joined the New Centre party in 2005, remaining until 2011. In 2011, he joined Democrats for Andorra.

On 16 May 2011, he was appointed the Minister of Foreign Affairs under Prime Minister Antoni Martí, succeeding Xavier Espot Miró. The representative for his term was Josep Maria Mauri on the Episcopal side, and Thierry Lataste from the French side. He was the President of the Committee of Ministers of the Council of Europe from November 9, 2012 until May 16, 2013, succeeding Edmond Panariti. He was followed in the role by Michael Spindelegger.

Remaining foreign minister, on May 28, 2014, Sunyé met with Chinese Foreign Minister Wang Yi in Beijing to discuss cooperation between the two countries. He was appointed the acting Prime Minister of Andorra on 23 March 2015, under Episcopal Co-prince Joan Enric Vives Sicília and French Co-prince François Hollande. He held the role until 1 April 2015, when it was again taken by his predecessor, Antoni Martí.

See also
List of current foreign ministers
List of heads of government of Andorra
List of foreign ministers in 2017 
Foreign relations of Andorra

References

External links 

 Ministry of Foreign Affairs of Andorra

|-

1966 births
Living people
Foreign Ministers of Andorra
Democratic Party (Andorra) politicians
Government ministers of Andorra
Members of the General Council (Andorra)
New Centre (Andorra) politicians
People from Sant Julià de Lòria
Toulouse 1 University Capitole alumni